In Canada, a standing committee is a permanent committee established by Standing Orders in the House of Commons or the Senate. It may study matters referred to it by special order or, within its area of responsibility in the Standing Orders, may undertake studies on its own initiative. There are currently 23 standing committees (including two standing joint committees) in the House and 20 in the Senate, many with particular responsibilities to examine the administration, policy development, and budgetary estimates of certain government departments and agencies. Certain standing committees are also given mandates to examine matters that have government-wide implications (e.g. official languages policy, multiculturalism policy) or that may not relate to a particular department (e.g. procedure of the House of Commons).

See also 
 Standing committee

References